Tony Wright (born 6 May 1968) is a British musician who is the lead singer of the British band Terrorvision and also the band Laika Dog.

Early life
Wright was born in Bradford to David Wright who was the owner of a Gallery in Bradford that showcased local artists. Originally wanting to become a Designer, Wright was convinced to take a Youth Training Scheme at a local printing firm.

He met the other founding members of Terrorvision whilst working as a glass collector and barman in a local pub and the band began their music career as The Spoilt Bratz.

Solo career
In March 2014, Wright announced a solo acoustic project. In September 2014 he released his debut solo album Thoughts 'N' All. The album was met with a positive review on PureRawk.com which called it "Down to Earth, unpretentious and easy to get on with".

In August 2016, he released Walnut Dash.

Other projects
Wright is the owner of Oldfield Press, and has produced a range of letterpress and woodcut printed cards that he sells online, at his coffeeshop / print studio / venue (Bloomfield Square) in Otley, Yorkshire and via a number of pop-up shops in the Keighley area. Following his career in Terrorvision, Wright also pursued a career in building miniature dry stone walls which he sold in galleries around Yorkshire.

During his time with Terrorvision Tony Wright was a popular and frequent guest on the BBC2 TV programme Never Mind the Buzzcocks, and also presented Top of the Pops.

References

1968 births
Living people
English rock singers
Musicians from Bradford